William, Willie, Bill or Billy Bryant may refer to:

Sport
 William Bryant (footballer, born 1874) (1874–?), played for Rotherham Town, Manchester United and Blackburn Rovers
 William Bryant (footballer, born 1899) (1899–1986), England international who played for Millwall
 Billy Bryant (1913–1975), footballer who played for Wrexham and Manchester United in the 1930s
 Bill Bryant (American football) (born 1951), American football player
 Bill Bryant (cricketer) (1906–1995), Australian cricketer
 Bill Bryant (golf executive) (1914–1983), American golf executive
 Bill Bryant (rugby league) (1940–2019), English rugby league footballer who played in the 1950s, 1960s and 1970s

Other people
 William Bryant (actor) (1924–2001), American actor
 William Bryant (convict) (1757–1791), convict on First Fleet to New South Wales
 William Bryant (industrialist), co-founder of the Bryant & May match company
 William Bryant (physician) (1730–1783), American physician
 William B. Bryant (1911–2005), senior federal judge and the first black federal prosecutor in the United States
 William Bradley Bryant, superintendent of public schools for the U.S. state of Georgia
 William Cullen Bryant (1794–1878), American poet
 William Maud Bryant (1933–1969), United States Army soldier and Medal of Honor recipient during the Vietnam War
 William P. Bryant (1806–1860), American state supreme court judge in Oregon Territory
 William R. Bryant Jr. (1938–2020), American politician
 Willie Bryant (1908–1964), American jazz musician and DJ
 William Bryant, Confederate spy in the American Civil War
 Bill Bryant (politician) (born 1957), Washington State politician

See also
 William Bryant Octagon House, historic house in Massachusetts
 William Jennings Bryan (1860–1925), American politician
 William O'Bryan (1778–1868), English Methodist preacher
 William Bryan (disambiguation)